Enkhuizen is a municipality and a city in the Netherlands, in the province of North Holland and the region of West-Frisia.

History 

Enkhuizen, like Hoorn and Amsterdam, was one of the harbor-towns of the VOC, from where  overseas trade with the East Indies was conducted. It received city rights in 1355. On June 24, 1572 during the Eighty Years' War, in Enkhuizen five Franciscans from Alkmaar were hanged: known as the martyrs of Alkmaar.

In the mid-17th century, Enkhuizen was at the peak of its power and was one of the most important harbor cities in the Netherlands. However, due to a variety of reasons, notably the silting up of the harbors, Enkhuizen lost its position to Amsterdam.

Tourism 
Enkhuizen has one of the largest marinas in the Netherlands. Zuiderzeemuseum is located in Enkhuizen. Architecturally, the Drommedaris is the oldest building in Enkhuizen, from 1540. Tourists take boat trips to and from the port to Medemblik.

Industry 
Industrially, Enkhuizen is home to a number of seed production companies,  Enza Zaden, Syngenta, Monsanto, as well as a plastics factory. Tourism is a large part of the economy, too.

Population centres 
The municipality of Enkhuizen consists of the following cities, towns, villages and/or districts: Enkhuizen, Oosterdijk, Westeinde.

Local government 
The municipal council of Enkhuizen consists of 17 seats, which are divided as follows:

Transport 
Enkhuizen station offers direct rail service to Hoorn, Amsterdam and Maastricht/Heerlen, with the journey to Amsterdam Centraal of around an hour.

Furthermore, during summer ferries for pedestrians and cyclists operate between Enkhuizen and Stavoren; between Enkhuizen and Medemblik; and between Enkhuizen and Urk.

It is also possible to drive or cycle across the Houtribdijk to Lelystad, passing under a naviduct near the Krabbersgat lock.

Notable buildings
Evangelical Lutheran Church (Enkhuizen)
 St Francis Xavier Church, Enkhuizen

Notable residents

Public thought and public service 
 Lucas Janszoon Waghenaer (ca.1534–1606) nautical cartographer
 Franciscus Maelson (1538–1601) a Dutch physician and statesman
 Dirck Gerritsz Pomp (1544–ca.1608) a sailor, the first known Dutch visitor to China and Japan
 Jan Huyghen van Linschoten (1563–1611), merchant, trader and historian
 Joris Carolus (ca.1566-ca.1636) a Dutch cartographer and explorer
 Johannes Antonides van der Linden (1609–1664) a Dutch physician, botanist and author
 Hermann Witsius (1636–1708) a Dutch theologian
 Cornelis Jan Simonsz (ca.1661–ca.1727) a Governor of Dutch Ceylon 1703/1707
 Jacob Mossel (1704– 1761) sailor and Governor-General of the Dutch East Indies 1750/1761 
 Jan Baas (born 1950) a Dutch politician and Mayor of Enkhuizen
 Gerrit Zalm (born 1952), banker, former Minister of Finance
 Stef Blok (born 1964) a Dutch politician and Minister of Foreign Affairs

The arts 
 Pieter Symonsz Potter (1597–1652) a Dutch Golden Age painter
 Willem Bartsius (1612–1657) a Dutch Golden Age painter. 
 Jacob Steendam (1615– ca.1672) a Dutch poet and minister  
 Paulus Potter (1625–1654), painter
 Pieter Gallis (1633–1697) a Dutch Golden Age painter
 Dirck Ferreris (1639–1693) a Dutch Golden Age painter
 Jos Lussenburg (1889–1975) a Dutch painter and musician
 Matthijs Verschoor (born 1955) a Dutch classical pianist and academic

Science and business 
 Jan Verbruggen (1712–1781) a Dutch master gun-founder and an artist 
 David de Gorter (1717–1783) a Dutch physician, botanist and academic 
 Gerbrand Bakker (1771–1828), physician, professor at the University of Groningen
 Harm Bart (born 1942) a Dutch mathematician, economist and academic

Sport 
 Corry Vreeken (born 1928) a Dutch chess Women's Grandmaster
 Nel Zwier (1936–2001) a Dutch high jumper, competed at the 1960 Summer Olympics
 Eljo Kuiler (born 1946) a former diver, competed at the 1968 Summer Olympics
 Wijda Mazereeuw (born 1953) a Dutch swimmer, competed in the 1972 & 1976 Summer Olympics

Gallery

References

Citations

Sources

External links 

 Official website

 
Municipalities of North Holland
Populated places in North Holland